Laurent Genty (born 3 March 1971) is a French racing cyclist. He rode in the 1996 Tour de France.

References

1971 births
Living people
French male cyclists
Place of birth missing (living people)